Creptotrema  is a genus of Trematoda belonging to the family Allocreadiidae.

The genus was first described by Travassos, Artigas & Pereira in 1928.
Its type-species is Creptotrema creptotrema Travassos, Artigas & Pereira, 1928.

According to a molecular and morphological study by  Franceschini et al. (2021), Creptotrema is a monophyletic genus of trematodes widely distributed across the Americas, which currently comprises 19 valid species of parasites of teleost fish and anurans.

Gallery of images of various Creptotrema species

References

Trematoda